Sverdrup Island is an uninhabited island in the far north of Greenland, in the Northeast Greenland National Park area. It is named after Otto Sverdrup.

Geography
Sverdrup Island is located west of Nansen Land, to the north of Freuchen Land off the mouth of J.P. Koch Fjord in the Lincoln Sea, and to the east of Elison Island and John Murray Island. The island has an area of 436 km ² and a shoreline of 130 kilometres. 

Chipp Sound in the west separates Sverdrup Island from smaller Elison Island and Mascart Sound in the east separates it from Nansen Land. Lemming Fjord has its mouth in the NW side of the island and extends deeply southwards, almost cutting Sverdrup Island in two. The island is mountainous, wth the highest summit rising to a height of 1,317 m.

See also
List of islands of Greenland
Peary Land

References

Islands of Greenland